Margit Geissler (1958–2016) was a German model, film and television actress. She co-hosted the 1985 competition to select the German entry for the Eurovision Song Contest. She was married to the film director Sigi Rothemund.

Selected filmography
 Nackt und heiß auf Mykonos (1979)
 Graf Dracula in Oberbayern (1979)
 Zum Gasthof der spritzigen Mädchen (1979)
 Beautiful and Wild on Ibiza (1980)
 Heiße Kartoffeln (1980)
 Ich bin dein Killer (1982)
 Das kann ja heiter werden (1982, TV series)
 Spring Symphony (1983)
 Beautiful Wilhelmine (1984, TV series)
 Starke Zeiten (1988)
 Marienhof (1995, TV series)

References

Bibliography 
 Mitchell, Charles P. The Great Composers Portrayed on Film, 1913 through 2002. McFarland, 2004.

External links 
 

1958 births
2016 deaths
Actresses from Berlin
German film actresses
German television actresses